Psarocharako is a large rock off the southern coast of the Greek island of Crete in the Libyan Sea. The islet is administered from Viannos in Heraklion regional unit near Tertsa.

References

Landforms of Heraklion (regional unit)
Uninhabited islands of Crete
Islands of Greece